The women's 100 metres hurdles at the 2017 World Championships in Athletics was held at the London Olympic Stadium on .

Summary
World record holder Kendra Harrison (USA) was the slowest time qualifier to the final, while 2011 champion Sally Pearson (AUS), Dawn Harper-Nelson (USA) and Pamela Dutkiewicz (GER) were the top three fastest. It was Harper-Nelson's fifth straight championship and fourth final.

In the final, Harrison was out slightly faster than Pearson, Christina Manning (USA) and heptathlete Nadine Visser over the first hurdle. Harrison held the lead until she rattled the third hurdle, where Pearson and Manning advanced, about even over the fourth hurdle, with a wall of Harrison, Dutkiewicz, Visser, Harper-Nelson and Alina Talay (BLR) mere inches behind. But Pearson was gaining a little ground at every hurdle as Harper-Nelson edged forward ahead of Manning. By the tenth barrier, Pearson had almost a metre lead, Harper Nelson another half metre on Manning, with Dutkiewicz and Harrison still just inches behind. On the run in to the finish, Harper-Nelson gained on Pearson, but not enough to grab gold, while Dutkiewicz got past Harrison and Manning, all leaning for a photo finish.

Records

Before the competition records were as follows:

No records were set at the competition.

Qualification standard
The standard to qualify automatically for entry was 12.98.

Schedule
The event schedule, in local time (UTC+1), was as follows:

Results

Heats
The first round took place on 11 August in five heats as follows:

The first four in each heat ( Q ) and the next four fastest ( q ) qualified for the semifinals. The overall results were as follows:

Semifinals
The semifinals took place on 11 August in three heats as follows:

The first two in each heat ( Q ) and the next two fastest ( q ) qualified for the final. The overall results were as follows:

Final
The final took place on 12 August at 20:05. The wind was +0.1 metres per second and the results were as follows (photo finish):

References

sprint hurdles
Sprint hurdles at the World Athletics Championships
Women's sport in London